India: Vision 2020 is a document prepared under the chairmanship of S. P. Gupta, Planning Commission. 

This vision document was inspired by APJ Abdul Kalam's 1998 book India 2020: A Vision for the New Millennium, which Kalam co-authored with Y. S. Rajan. This was preceded by a set of documents, Technology Vision 2020, prepared in the mid-1990s under the Technology Information, Forecasting and Assessment Council (TIFAC) of India's Department of Science and Technology during the chairmanship of Kalam.

References

Further reading 

 Technology Vision 2035. TIFAC.

Economy of India
2020 in India
India